Ward–Force House and Condit Family Cook House is located in Livingston, Essex County, New Jersey, United States. The house was built in 1745 and was added to the National Register of Historic Places on December 29, 1981.

See also
National Register of Historic Places listings in Essex County, New Jersey

References

External links
Force Homestead Museum

Houses on the National Register of Historic Places in New Jersey
Houses completed in 1745
Houses in Essex County, New Jersey
Livingston, New Jersey
National Register of Historic Places in Essex County, New Jersey
New Jersey Register of Historic Places
1745 establishments in New Jersey